Giovanna is an Italian feminine first name. It is the feminine counterpart of the masculine Giovanni, which in turn is the Italian form of John; it is thus the Italian equivalent of Jane, Joanna, Jeanne, etc. In Brazil, the feminine name Giovanna has many variations, the most common of which is Geovanna.

People known by this name include:

 Giovanna of Italy (Tsarina Ioanna of Bulgaria) born Princess Giovanna of Savoy and was the last Tsarina of Bulgaria
 Giovanna (singer)
 Giovana Queiroz

References

Italian feminine given names
Given names